José Antonio Goldberger Gomes Nogueira is a Brazilian football coach who is the head coach of Capital FC. He has previously coached the national teams of Pakistan, Sierra Leone, Guinea-Bissau and Saint Kitts and Nevis.

Coaching career
Nogueira started his coaching career in 1998 with University of São Paulo. His first professional football team was Nacional. He also coached Emelec, Al-Ahli, ABC Futebol Clube and others. Nogueira has also coached internationally with Sierra Leone in 2003, Guinea-Bissau in 2006, and Saint Kitts and Nevis in 2011.

In 2018, he was appointed to coach the Pakistan national football team. He signed a three year contract according to the head of the PFF, Faisal Saleh Hayat. He was let go by the PFF in 2019. He claimed that PFF had not paid him his salary and filed a case against PFF. He eventually won the legal battle in August 2020.

Honours

Club
Emelec
Ecuadorian Serie A:1998 : Runner-up

Al-Ahli
Kings Cup: 2007 : Champion

References

1965 births
Living people
Sportspeople from São Paulo
Brazilian footballers
Association footballers not categorized by position
Brazilian football managers
Nacional Atlético Clube (SP) managers
Nagoya Grampus managers
C.S. Emelec managers
Sierra Leone national football team managers
São Bernardo Futebol Clube managers
Guinea-Bissau national football team managers
Al-Ahli Saudi FC managers
ABC Futebol Clube managers
Saint Kitts and Nevis national football team managers
Grêmio Barueri Futebol managers
Associação Portuguesa de Desportos managers
Pakistan national football team managers
Brazilian expatriate football managers
Brazilian expatriate sportspeople in Japan
Expatriate football managers in Japan
Brazilian expatriate sportspeople in Ecuador
Expatriate football managers in Ecuador
Expatriate football managers in Sierra Leone
Expatriate football managers in Guinea-Bissau
Brazilian expatriate sportspeople in Saudi Arabia
Expatriate football managers in Saudi Arabia
Expatriate football managers in Saint Kitts and Nevis
Brazilian expatriate sportspeople in Pakistan
Expatriate football managers in Pakistan